Baulus may refer to:
Baulus, Turkey, a village identified with the ancient site of Berissa, 25 kilometres south-west of Tokat
Bolus (Belgium), a Belgian pastry